William Joseph Snelling (December 26, 1804 – December 24, 1848) was an American adventurer, writer, poet, and journalist. His short stories about American Indian life were the first to attempt to accurately portray the Plains Indians and among the first attempts at realism by an American writer. Snelling's short story collections were among the earliest in the United States.

Snelling was born and educated in Boston, Massachusetts. He moved to the American frontier in Minnesota and, from his late teens to his mid-20s, traded with the American Indians and explored the area. He lived with the Dakota Indians for a time and learned their language and customs. In 1828, Snelling returned to Boston and began a writing career. He wrote for New England periodicals and earned friends and enemies with his opinion pieces on American society. Over the next 20 years, he tackled subjects such as American writing, gambling, and prison conditions.

Early life and career
William Joseph Snelling was born on December 26, 1804, in Boston, Massachusetts. His father, Josiah Snelling, was an officer in the army, and his mother was Elizabeth Bell. His mother died when he was six years old, and Snelling moved outside Boston to live with relatives and attend school. At age 14, Snelling entered West Point.

Two years later, Snelling left school and gradually moved west. He lived with the Dakota tribe of American Indians for a winter. In 1821, Snelling reached his father's military post at Fort St. Anthony (later Fort Snelling) in Minnesota. William Joseph Snelling stayed there for five years, trading in furs and exploring the surroundings. During his time with the Dakota, he had learned their language and customs, and he worked as an interpreter between the Indian Agency and the Indians. For example, he helped negotiate the resolution of hostilities between the Dakota and the Chippewa and Winnebago tribes. In 1826, Snelling married Dionice Fournier, a Frenchwoman. She died a year later. Josiah Snelling died in 1828, and William Joseph Snelling moved on.

Writing career
Snelling returned to Boston and entered the writing field. Over the next 20 years, he wrote pieces for American Monthly, Boston Book, the Boston Herald, the New England Galaxy, New England Magazine, North American Review, and Token. Snelling expressed frank opinions on American society and proposed social reforms, earning him both praise and enmity. Truth: A New Year's Gift for Scribblers is an early example. The piece, written in 1831, satirizes American letters. As editor of the New England Galaxy, Snelling initiated an anti-gambling movement among Boston's newspapers. He was sued for libel and fought back by publishing his editorials in pamphlet form, called "Exposé of the Vice of Gaming", in 1833. He used the proceeds to pay his legal costs. He later served four months in jail for drunkenness. The experience led him in 1837 to take on prison reform with his The Rat-Trap; or Cogitations of a Convict in the House of Correction.

Snelling earned his greatest fame as a writer of short stories about his experiences on the American frontier. He realized that the lifestyle of the Plains Indians was under threat, and he deemed the popular characterization of Indians in American literature to be stereotyped and inaccurate. He thus tried for realism in his stories, making him one of the earliest American writers to do so. Modern ethnographers still recognize his works as the first accurate literary portrayal of the lifestyle of the Plains Indians. In "The Last of the Iron Hearts", Snelling wrote, "[We] beg leave to assure our readers, that the Indian is not the ferocious brute of Hubbard and Mather, or the brilliant, romantic, half-French, half-Celtic Mohegan and Yemassee created by Symmes and Cooper." He further claimed that one "must live, emphatically, live, with Indians; share with them their lodges, their food, and their blankets, for years, before he can comprehend their ideas, or enter into their feelings."

Snelling's tales met with critical acclaim, and modern critics praise them. In 1923, Fred Lewis Pattee wrote that "his Indian stories are undoubtedly the best written during the early period [of American literature]" Contemporary biographer Mary R. Reichardt credits Snelling with "creating . . . engaging and vigorous tales based on Native-American life and legend as well as stories of the cultural conflict resulting from the early white settlements on the frontier", although the stories "lapse at times into sentimentality and didacticism."

In 1830, Snelling published a compilation of ten of his frontier stories as Tales of the Northwest; or, Sketches of Indian Life and Character; this is one of the earliest short story collections published in the United States.

In 1831, Snelling published the comprehensive history The Polar Regions of the Western Continent Explored which took an imperialistic view of the North American Arctic. In the first paragraph he went so far as to lay a claim on Iceland as "a natural appendage of America".

Snelling also wrote poetry about his experiences. He wrote children's stories of adventure and travel under the pseudonym Solomon Bell. Snelling died on December 24, 1848.

Notes

References
 Reichardt, Mary R. (1999). "SNELLING, William Joseph", American National Biography, Vol. 10. New York: Oxford University Press. .

American explorers
American newspaper editors
19th-century American poets
American male poets
Writers from Minnesota
Writers from Boston
1804 births
1848 deaths
19th-century American journalists
American male journalists
19th-century American short story writers
19th-century American male writers